Vestalia was a Roman religious festival in honor of Vesta, the goddess of the hearth and the burning continuation of the sacred fire of Rome. It was held from 7-15 June.

Domestic and family life in general were represented by the festival of the goddess of the house and of the spirits of the storechamber — Vesta and the Penates — on Vestalia. On the first day of festivities the penus Vestae (sanctum sanctorum of the temple of Vesta which was usually curtained off) was opened, for the only time during the year, at which women offered sacrifices. As long as the curtain remained open, mothers could come, barefoot and disheveled, to leave offerings to the goddess in exchange for a blessing to them and their family. 

The animal consecrated to Vesta, the donkey, was crowned with garlands of flowers and bits of bread on 9 June. Ovid says that donkeys were adorned with necklaces of bread-bits in memory of the myth where Vesta is nearly violated by Priapus. In that myth, it is the untimely bray of a donkey that startles Priapus and causes him to flee. Before that, he says donkeys were honored on 9 June in thanks for the services they provided in the bakeries. 

The final day, 15 June, was Quando Stercum Delatum Fas ["when dung may be removed lawfully"]. The penus Vestae was solemnly closed, the Flaminica Dialis observed mourning, and the temple was subjected to a purification called stercoratio: the filth was swept from the temple and carried next by the route called clivus Capitolinus and then into the Tiber.

The military Feriale Duranum of AD 224 records the first day of Vestalia as Vesta  and the last day as Vesta cluditur.

See also
 Roman festivals
 Carmentalia
 Floralia
 Cerealia
 Fornacalia
 Opiconsivia
 Divalia
 Furrinalia
 Matralia
 Lemuria (festival)
 Matronalia
 Liberalia
 Parilia
 Rosalia, a festival of roses celebrated throughout the Roman Empire
 May Queen

References

Modern sources

 

Ancient Roman festivals
June observances
Summer festivals
Vesta (mythology)